This is a list of Swedish armoured regiments, battalions, corps and companies that have existed in the Swedish Army. They are listed in three ways, first by the actual units that have existed, then by the various names these units have had, and last by the various designations these units have had.

By unit 
P 1 Göta pansarlivgarde (1943–1963)
P 1 Göta livgarde (1963–1980)
P 2 Skånska pansarregementet (1942–1963)
P 2 Norra skånska dragonregementet (1994–1998)
P 2 Skånska dragonregementet (1963–1994 and 1998–2000)
P 3 Södermanlands pansarregemente (1942–1957)
P 4 Skaraborgs pansarregemente (1942–1963)
P 4 Skaraborgs regemente (1963– )
P 5 Norrbottens pansarbataljon (1957–1975)
I 19/P 5 Norrbottens regemente med Norrbottens pansarbataljon (1975–1994)
I 19 Norrbottens regemente (1994– )
P 6 Norra skånska regementet (1963–1994)
P 7 Södra skånska regementet (1963– )
P 10 Södermanlands regemente (1963–2005)
P 18 Gotlands regemente (1963–2005 and 2018–)

By name 
Gotlands regemente
Göta livgarde
Göta pansarlivgarde
Norra skånska regementet
Norrbottens pansarbataljon
Norrbottens regemente
Norrbottens regemente och Norrbottensbrigaden
Norrbottens regemente med Norrbottens pansarbataljon
Skaraborgs pansarregemente
Skaraborgs regemente
Skaraborgs regemente och Skaraborgsbrigaden
Skånska dragonregementet
Skånska pansarregementet
Södermanlands pansarregemente
Södermanlands regemente
Södra skånska regementet

By designation 
I 19
I 19/P 5
MekB 9
MekB 19
P 1
P 2
P 2/Fo 14
P 3
P 4
P 4/Fo 35
P 5
P 6
P 6/Fo 14
P 7
P 7/Fo 11
P 10
P 10/Fo 43
P 18
Pbat/I 19

See also 
List of Swedish regiments
Military district (Sweden)
List of Swedish defence districts

References 
Print

Online

 
armoured